The Meet You There Tour was the third headlining concert tour by Australian pop rock band 5 Seconds of Summer in support of their third studio album Youngblood. The tour began in Osaka, Japan on 2 August 2018, and concluded in Madrid, Spain on 19 November 2018.

A live recording was released on 21 December 2018 under the title Meet You There Tour Live.

Background 
Following their March 2018 to June 2018 5SOS III promotional world tour which sold out within three minutes and was praised by critics, the band announced that they would be embarking on another world tour in support of their third studio album, Youngblood.

The band announced the North America dates on 13 April 2018. They announced the Australian dates on 21 May 2018. The European dates were added on 8 June 2018. Additional UK dates were added for Glasgow, Manchester and London on 14 June 2018.

Live album 

Meet You There Tour Live is the second live album by Australian pop rock band 5 Seconds of Summer. Announced via Twitter, the album was digitally released on 21 December 2018 without any prior notice. Additionally, they released a vinyl version. It features all the songs performed live during the band's third tour except for "Girls Talk Boys".

Charts

Setlist 

The following setlist is from the first show of the tour on 2 August 2018 in Osaka, Japan. It is not intended to represent all concerts for 5 Seconds Of Summer’s "Meet You There" tour:

 "Babylon" 
 "Talk Fast" 
 "Moving Along" 
 "Girls Talk Boys"
 "She’s Kinda Hot"
 "Waste The Night" 
 "More" 
 "Better Man" 
 "If Walls Could Talk" 
 "Ghost Of You" 
 "Amnesia"
 "The Only Reason" 
 "Lie to Me" 
 "Why Won’t You Love Me" 
 "Valentine" 
 "Meet You There" 
 "Jet Black Heart"
 "Want You Back" 
Encore
 "She Looks So Perfect"
"Youngblood"
Other songs
 "Champagne Supernova" by Oasis was played on the second Manchester show (27 October 2018)
 "Wherever You Are" was performed at the Paris show (13 November 2018)

Tour dates

Personnel
 Luke Hemmings – lead vocals, rhythm guitar, piano
 Calum Hood – bass guitar, keyboard, vocals
 Michael Clifford – lead guitar, vocals, piano
 Ashton Irwin – drums, percussion, vocals

References

2018 concert tours
5 Seconds of Summer concert tours
Concert tours of Japan
Concert tours of New Zealand
Concert tours of Australia
Concert tours of Canada
Concert tours of the United States
Concert tours of the United Kingdom
Concert tours of Belgium
Concert tours of the Netherlands
Concert tours of Germany
Concert tours of Denmark
Concert tours of Norway
Concert tours of Sweden
Concert tours of France
Concert tours of Switzerland
Concert tours of Italy
Concert tours of Spain